The Duck Lake Fire occurred north of the Village of Newberry in Luce County, Michigan in the eastern half of the Upper Peninsula of Michigan.  The fire started with a lightning strike on Wednesday, May 23, 2012 near Duck Lake.  The Duck Lake Fire was reported 100% contained by the Michigan DNR on 15 June 2012 with 21,135 acres burned.  The Duck Lake Fire was reported as the third worst fire in Michigan since 1881.  It was the second major fire in Luce County within five years. On May 25, 2012, Governor Rick Snyder declared a state of disaster in Luce and Schoolcraft counties, which included a ban of fireworks and an outdoor burning ban in 49 counties, including all counties located in the Upper Peninsula and much of the northern half of the Lower Peninsula as a result of abnormally dry conditions. The fire caused the closure of Tahquamenon Falls State Park during the Memorial Day weekend.

Fire progression 

The fire began in the vicinity of Duck Lake, near Falls Road and M-123 and burned towards the north over largely uninhabited jack pine forest. At that point, the fire affected an area slightly smaller than that of the Sleeper Lakes fire. By May 31, 2012 the most recent GPS size estimate showed the fire had burned . Hundreds of properties had been affected and 132 structures (including 46 homes) were lost. Fire crews made progress with 51% percent containment. Several showers and thunderstorms helped during the afternoon and evening. The total cost to date for the wildfire is $450,557. By June 4, the fire was reported as 72 percent contained with no smoke plume and no significant activity since May 28. Damage assessments found 136 structures lost: 49 homes/cabins (including a store and a motel), 23 garages, 38 sheds or outbuildings and 26 campers on 21,135 burnt acres.

By June 15, 2012, the fire was 100% contained after almost 43 miles of fire line were built. 300 people were involved in the fire response.

Notes

See also

List of Michigan wildfires

References

External links
  Satellite imagery and burn severity maps of the Duck Lake Fire

Luce County, Michigan
Wildfires in Michigan
2012 wildfires in the United States
2012 in Michigan